Miguel Angel Centeno (born 18 July 1957) is an American sociologist.

Centeno was educated at Yale University, where he received a Bachelor of Arts degree in history in 1980, followed by a master of business administration in 1987, and a doctorate in sociology in 1990. He is the Musgrave Professor of Sociology at Princeton University, and teaches sociology and international affairs at the university's Princeton School of Public and International Affairs.

References

1957 births
Living people
21st-century social scientists
American sociologists
Yale College alumni
Princeton University faculty